Felipe de Jesús Villanueva Gutiérrez (5 February 1862 - 28 May 1893) was a Mexican violinist, virtuoso pianist and composer. Villanueva remains one of the most well-known figures of the Mexican musical romanticism – flourishing during the historical period known in Mexico as the Porfiriato.

Biography
At the age of ten, Villanueva wrote his Patriotic Cantata, for piano and four voices – a year later, he composed a Mazurka for piano The Last Farewell. In 1873, Villanueva was accepted into the National Conservatory of Music under the director of the establishment, Alfredo Bablot. However, he was later rejected from the conservatory, therein commences studies in piano and harmony in private classes with the teacher Antonio Valle.

In 1876, at the age of fourteen, he entered as a violinist the orchestra of the Teatro Hidalgo directed by José C. Camacho, from whom he received composition lessons. In 1879 the international company Wagner and Levien Sucs. Villanueva published pieces for piano: The Eruption of Peñol and The Arrival of the Cyclone, which became known among the Mexican public.

In 1887, he founded, together with Ricardo Castro, Gustavo E. Campa and other Mexican musicians – the Musical Institute – an official academy of the Group of Six, which transformed the musical education of Mexico with a fundamental contribution by Villanueva, who published works by Johann Sebastian Bach, Frédéric Chopin, and pianistic giants of his time, including Franz Liszt and Anton Rubinstein.

Professor José Ovando Ramírez in his book "Felipe Villanueva Gutiérrez, his time, his life, his work", refers to the fact that this illustrious musician and composer developed his work at that time in which Italian music predominated in musical preferences in Europe and America, including Mexico, coupled with certain reminiscences of the Viennese waltz that introduced an Austrian orchestra to our country in the time of the Emperor Maximilian. Added to the originality of the Mexican musical compositions, they gave rise to consider Felipe Villanueva Gutiérrez as one of the outstanding precursors of Mexican musical nationalism of century XIX. A time when the Mexican waltz was distinguished by its quiet times, with intimate character, longings in its rhythmic and of remarkable musical quality, like the waltz "God never dies" of Macedonio Alcalá, "On the waves" of Juventino Rosas and " Vals poetic ", first waltz from a group of three slow waltzes" Causerie "," Love "mazurks:" Ebelia "," In dance "," Golden dream "and dances" Ana "and" Luz "by Felipe Villanueva Gutiérrez.

Although he died prematurely in 1893 at the age of 31, he left numerous works for piano, for singing and piano, and the comic opera Keofar (1892), which premiered at the Teatro Principal in Mexico City, with great success. His poetic Waltz is known both in his version for piano alone and in the symphonic arrangement made by Gustavo E. Campa. His work for piano has been recorded by several Mexican concertgoers. His mortal remains were transferred in 1945 to the Rotunda of Illustrious Persons of Mexico City.

Compositions

 Nocturno "Amar" (1872)
 Idolina (1872)
 Lamento (1872)
 Mazurka "Sueño Dorado" (1872)
 Un día de asueto (1872)
 Mazurka "La despedida" (1873)
 Danza "El último adiós" (1874)
 Vals "La caída de las montañas de Tecámac" (1876)
 Vals "A orillas del Guadalquivir", Vals "Natalia" (1879)
 Danza "La brisa", Danza "La erupción del peñol", Danza "La llegada del ciclón" (1880)
 Mazurka No. 3 Op. 27 (1886)
 Schottisch "Ana", Schottisch "¡Ay qué dos!", Danza "La pedradas", Schottisch "Luz" (1887)
 Gavota, a cuatro manos (1888)
 Vals lento "Causerie", Vals poético (1890)
 Lamento, a la memoria del gran patricio Benito Juárez (1891)
 Mazurka "Sueño Dorado" (1892)
 Keofar (1892)
 Vals de salón "Amor", Minueto (Fecha de la composición desconocida)
 Vals de salón "Amor", Minueto (Fecha de la composición desconocida)
Seis danzas humorísticas. 
Algo se pesca. 
¿Y por qué?. 
¡Oh!, la, la. 
Amorosa. 
Adelante. 
Enredo. 
Dos danzas. 
Cupido. 
Venus. 
Dos gavotas. 
Ebelia, mazurka de salón. 
El cariño, vals. 
En el paraíso, dos danzas. 
Adán. 
Eva. 
En el baile, mazurka. . 
María, mazurka. 
Mariquita, polka. 
Primera mazurka, Op. 20. 
Segunda mazurka, Op. 25. 
Tercera mazurka, Op. 27. 
Recuerdo, vals. 
Un sueño después del baile. 
Vals de concierto.

External links
 

1862 births
1893 deaths
19th-century classical composers
Male opera composers
Mexican classical composers
Mexican male classical composers
Mexican opera composers
Mexican Romantic composers
19th-century male musicians
Musicians from the State of Mexico